Zachary Bichotte Paul Brault-Guillard (born December 30, 1998) is a Canadian professional soccer player who plays as a right-back for Major League Soccer club CF Montréal and the Canadian national team.

Early life
Brault-Guillard was born in Haiti and raised in Montreal after being adopted by a Quebecois and French couple. Brault-Guillard was raised in Montreal until the age of seven before relocating to France. As a youth, he spent time with Lagnieu and Ain Sud, in the Auvergne-Rhône-Alpes region, before entering the Olympique Lyonnais academy with the under-13 team.

Club career

Montreal Impact / CF Montréal
In February 2019, Brault-Guillard joined the Montreal Impact on loan from Olympique Lyonnais. He made his debut on March 2 in Montreal's season opener against the San Jose Earthquakes, as a substitute for Ignacio Piatti in the 85th minute.

Brault-Guillard transferred to Montreal permanently on January 25, 2020. Upon completion of the 2021 MLS season, CF Montréal would announce that they would exercise the option on Brault-Guillard's contract for 2022.

International career

Youth
Brault-Guillard was named to the Canadian U-23 provisional roster for the 2020 CONCACAF Men's Olympic Qualifying Championship on February 26, 2020. He was named to the final squad ahead of the re-scheduled tournament on March 10, 2021.

Senior
Brault-Guillard made his international debut for Canada on October 16, 2018, coming on as a substitute in the 66th minute for Liam Millar in the 2019–20 CONCACAF Nations League qualifying match against Dominica. The match finished as a 5–0 home win for Canada. He was named to the final 23-man squad for the 2019 CONCACAF Gold Cup on May 30, 2019.

On June 2, 2021, Brault-Guillard scored his first goal for Canada, netting the fourth goal in a 7-0 victory over Aruba in a World Cup qualifying match.

Career statistics

Club

International

International goals

Honours

Club 
CF Montreal
 Canadian Championship: 2019, 2021

Individual 
 Canadian Championship - Best Young Canadian Player Award: 2019

Notes

References

External links
 
 Lyon profile

1998 births
Living people
People from Ouest (department)
Soccer players from Montreal
Canadian soccer players
Canada men's international soccer players
Canada men's youth international soccer players
Haitian footballers
Haitian emigrants to Canada
Canadian sportspeople of Haitian descent
Naturalized citizens of Canada
Canadian adoptees
Haitian Quebecers
Association football defenders
Ain Sud players
Championnat National 3 players
Olympique Lyonnais players
Major League Soccer players
CF Montréal players
2019 CONCACAF Gold Cup players
Canadian expatriate soccer players
Canadian expatriate sportspeople in France
Expatriate footballers in France